Nathan Nunn (born July 9, 1974) is a Canadian economist and Professor at the University of British Columbia. He is best known for his research on the long-term effects of slave trade on Africa. Other research interests include economic development, cultural economics, political economy and international trade.

Biography 

A native of Canada, Nathan Nunn earned first a B.A. in economics from Simon Fraser University in 1998 and then a M.A. and PhD in economics from the University of Toronto in 2000 and 2005, respectively. After his graduation, Nunn worked as an assistant professor at the University of British Columbia before moving to Harvard University in 2007. There, he was promoted to the Paul Sack Associate Professorship in Political Economy in 2011, became full professor in 2012, and has held the position of Frederic E. Abbe Professor of Economics since 2016. Nunn maintains affiliations with NBER, BREAD, the Weatherhead Center for International Affairs, the Center for African Studies, and the Center for the Environment. Moreover, Nunn currently serves as an Editor of the Quarterly Journal of Economics and has performed editorial duties at the Journal of Comparative Economics, Review of Economics and Statistics, Journal of International Economics, Journal of Development Economics, and the Canadian Journal of Economics in the past.

Research 

Nathan Nunn's research focuses on economic history, economic development, cultural economics, political economy and international trade. A recurrent theme in Nunn's research is the long-term impact of historical processes on economic development, often mediated through institutions, culture, knowledge and technology. According to IDEAS/RePEc, Nathan Nunn belongs to the 2% of most cited economists. Key findings of his research include the following:
 Countries' ability to enforce contracts is possibly a more important determinant of their comparative advantage than skilled labour and physical capital combined.
 A substantial part of Africa's current underdevelopment appears to be caused by the long-term effects of the Atlantic, Indian Ocean, Trans-Saharan and Red sea slave trade.
 Current differences in trust levels within Africa are attributable to the impact of the slave trades, which have caused the emergence of low-trust cultural norms, beliefs, and values in ethnic groups heavily affected by slavery (with Leonard Wantchekon).
 By impeding not only trade and technological diffusion but also the depredations of slave traders, the ruggedness of certain African regions' terrain had a significant positive impact on these regions' development (with Diego Puga).
 The introduction of the potato within the Columbian exchange may have been responsible for at least a quarter of the population and urbanisation growth observed in the Old World between 1700 and 1900 (with Nancy Qian).
 In line with Boserup's hypothesis, the introduction and historical use of plough agriculture appears to have given men a comparative advantage and made gender norms less equal, with historical differences in the plough use of immigrants' ancestral communities predicting their attitudes regarding gender equality (with Alberto Alesina and Paola Giuliano).
 U.S. Food Aid is driven by U.S. objectives and can lead to increased conflict in recipient countries (with Nancy Qian).

References

External links 
Webpage of Nathan Nunn at Harvard University

1974 births
Living people
Harvard University faculty
Economic historians
Canadian development economists
Simon Fraser University
Alfred P. Sloan Prize winners
University of Toronto
21st-century  Canadian  economists
21st-century Canadian historians
Fellows of the Econometric Society